Brian S. Loughmiller was the mayor of McKinney, Texas from 2009 to 2017, after serving two terms as the council member of District 4.

Loughmiller is currently a managing partner of Loughmiller Higgins P.C., a McKinney based firm specializing in family law.

Election history

2009

References

Mayors of places in Texas
Living people
21st-century American politicians
People from McKinney, Texas
Year of birth missing (living people)